Tsoala is a genus of flowering plants belonging to the family Solanaceae.

Its native range is Madagascar.

Species:
 Tsoala tubiflora Bosser & D'Arcy

References

Solanaceae
Solanaceae genera